Stephen Thomas Saux, Jr.(April 2, 1972) is an American actor, writer, cinematographer and short film producer. He is best known for his work creating the web series The Life of Lori Murphy, Ninja Mom and the award-winning short film, The Want. He is a graduate of The Second City and was a founding member of the “Jumping the Shark” improv troop. His most notable television credits include recurring roles on NBC's The Office, The Ranch on Netflix and the FOX comedy Dads.  Early film credits include Deliver Us from Eva and the Farrelly brothers comedy Stuck on You.  He is the face of the Southern Nevada Water Authority conservation commercial campaign and also appeared on the cover of the video game Call of Duty 2: Big Red One. Saux starred in the theater production of The Portrait of a Life, a play written by his wife, performed at the famed NoHo Arts Center in North Hollywood, CA.

Filmography
Call Me Kat .... Greg
B Positive .... Anesthesiologist
The Ranch - 3 Episodes .... Mike
Ninja Mom (Web Series)
The Life of Lori Murphy (Web Series) - 5 Episodes .... Stephen
Dads - 2 Episodes .... Waiter/Painted Chest Guy
NCIS - Episode: About Face ... Patrick Turner
The Office (US) - 9 Episodes .... Justin Spitzer
A Man's World  .... William Barrington
Call of Duty 2: Big Red One  .... Pvt. Roland Roger
Call of Duty 2  .... Pvt. Roland Roger
The Big House - Episode: A Friend in Need  .... Buddy
The Attendant .... Duece
Return to Babylon .... Mr. Producer
Stuck on You  .... Drive-by Heckler
An American Reunion  .... Dr. M
Deliver Us from Eva  .... Bartender
Lost in the USA  .... Customs Officer
Citizens of Perpetual Indulgence  .... Film Festival Judge
A Crack in the Floor  .... Kevin Gordon
Ballad of the Nightingale  .... Mitch
Fallout  .... Marine
Caroline in the City - Episode: Caroline and the Toothbrush  .... The Trainer
The Triggerman  .... Nero

References

External links

Official Website
Production Company: To The Moon And Back Again Productions

1972 births
Living people
American male film actors
American male television actors
20th-century American male actors
21st-century American male actors